Joan Bicknell (10 April 1939 – 12 June 2017) was Britain's first female psychiatry professor. She worked at St George's, University of London and pioneered the area of learning disability. She confronted cruelty at psychiatric hospitals and was a human rights advocate of institutionalized people with intellectual disabilities, unpopular with and never accepted by the medical establishment. She introduced multidisciplinary hospital management and community-based care.

Early life and education
Joan Bicknell was born into a working-class family in Isleworth, West London, UK. Her father Albert worked as a bricklayer, later in bomb disposal with Royal Engineers. Her mother, Dorothy (née Smith), was a secretary. She had an older brother, Edward, who died as a teacher in Swaziland. She also had two fostered brothers with intellectual disabilities. Bicknell attended Twickenham County School for Girls and studied medicine at Birmingham University in 1962.

Career
After graduation she worked with children at Ilesha Wesley Guild hospital in Oyo, Nigeria as a Methodist missionary. When the Nigerian Civil War began in 1967, she left for Sierra Leone to work with the flying doctor service.
She returned to the UK to study psychiatry at Queen Mary's Hospital, in Carshalton, a hospital for long-term care of children in Surrey. 
In 1969, she obtained a diploma in psychological medicine, and in 1971 she completed a thesis on causes and prevalence of lead poisoning in institutionalised children. She became a consultant psychiatrist at Botleys Park Hospital in Chertsey, Surrey. In 1978, she was appointed to a task force modernising psychiatric care at Normansfield Hospital. She introduced managing a hospital through a multidisciplinary team rather than, as was then customary, a Medical Superintendent.

Eventually Bicknell was awarded a professorship at St George's, University of London and became Britain's first female professor in psychiatry. In her inaugural lecture 19 November 1980 called "psychopathology of handicap" she dealt with the family's reaction to the diagnosis of intellectual disability drawing an analogy to the stages of grief in the bereavement process.

Bicknell concentrated on humanising care of people with intellectual disabilities. She took a position in bioethical hot spots years before others like the sterilization of minors with developmental disabilities in 1988, compared to the American Academy of Pediatrics for example in 1990.

Her approach challenged the expectation that people were better not cared for in their own homes and meant that Bicknell was never part of the medical establishment.

Personal life
Bicknell had asthma and other health problems, eventually mental illness. She retired early at age 50. She moved to Dorset county with her partner Diana Worsley, owning a farm for children with disabilities to have contact with animals. She died of cancer in Stalbridge in Dorset county.

Legacy
In 1990, the Psychiatry of Disability Division at St George's Hospital Medical School, established the Joan Bicknell Prize for the best essay on an aspect of the Psychiatry of Disability written and presented by a registrar and senior registrar. A building in Tooting, London was named Joan Bicknell Centre.

Further reading 
 J. Bicknell The psychopathology of handicap. Br J Med Psychol. 1983 Jun;56 (Pt 2):167-78.  
J. Bicknell. Sterilization for mentally handicapped girls. Br J Hosp Med. 1988 Apr;39(4):353.  
 J. Bicknell. Consent and people with mental handicap. BMJ. 1989 Nov 11; 299(6709): 1176–1177. .
J. Bicknell. List of contributors Journal Psychodynamic counselling. Volume 6, 2000, Issue 1, Pages 123–126.

References

1939 births
2017 deaths
English psychiatrists
Alumni of the University of Birmingham
Academics of St George's, University of London
People from Isleworth
Patient advocacy
English human rights activists
Women human rights activists
British expatriates in Nigeria